Arjen Tuiten is a Netherlands-born American Special effects make-up artist. Tuiten started his career under the supervision of  Stan Winston, Rick Baker, and Dick Smith.  He worked on films Terminator 3: Rise of the Machines (2003), Pan's Labyrinth (2006), Terminator Salvation (2009), Iron Man 2, The Twilight Saga: Breaking Dawn – Part 1 (2011),  Maleficent (2014), Wonder (2017) and Welcome to Marwen (2018). For his work on Wonder, he received an Academy Award for Best Makeup and Hairstyling nomination at the 90th Academy Awards.

References

External links
 

1980 births
Living people
Special effects people
Dutch make-up artists
Dutch expatriates in the United States
People from Skarsterlân